The Battle of Holkrans or Holkrantz (6 May 1902) took place at Holkrans, near Vryheid in KwaZulu-Natal, South Africa during the second Anglo-Boer War.

History 
To stop the raids operated by the Boers on their cattle and crops as a punishment for helping the British, the leader of the abaQulusi, Sikhobobho, responded by assembling his forces and attacked the commando camp at the foot of Holkrans hill. The Zulus attacked at night, and in a mutual bloodbath, the Boers lost 56 killed and 3 wounded, while the Zulus suffered 52 killed and 48 wounded. This battle was the last victory of the abaQulusi to date.

Further reading 
 Ian Knight, Companion to the Anglo-Zulu War, Pen and Sword military, UK, 2008

External links 
 Military History of South Africa

References 

History of KwaZulu-Natal
May 1902 events
Zulu history
Holkrans
Holkrans